11i may refer to:

11i (album), an album by The Supreme Beings of Leisure
Oracle 11i, an Oracle Applications version
WPA2, an international standard specifying security mechanisms for wireless networks

See also
IEEE 802.11i-2004, an international standard specifying security mechanisms for wireless networks